Golding & Company is a defunct American manufacturer of platen printing presses and printers' tools, established in 1869 by William Hughson Golding (1845–1916) in the Fort Hill area of Boston, Massachusetts.

History

Before 1895, Golding hired Henry Lewis Bullen to print its house organ, which increased sales of the Pearl. In 1906, Golding's factories moved to Franklin, Massachusetts; its showrooms remained in Boston.

William Golding died in 1916, but his two sons continued the enterprise. In 1918, Golding was acquired by American Type Founders (ATF). The Pearl continued to be made and sold by the Golding Press Division of ATF. In 1927, Thomson National Company (manufacturers of the Colt's Armory Press) bought Golding from ATF.

In 1936, the Craftsmen Machinery Company, of Dedham, Massachusetts, somehow acquired jigs and patterns for the 7 x 11 Improved Pearl, selling it as the CMC Jobber until 1955.

Printing presses
 Official (~1872)
 Pearl (1876)
 Improved Pearl (1895)
 Jobber

References

Manufacturing companies based in Boston
Companies established in 1869
Type foundries
Printing press manufacturers
1869 establishments in Massachusetts
Defunct manufacturing companies based in Massachusetts